Engel v. Vitale, 370 U.S. 421 (1962), was a landmark United States Supreme Court case in which the Court ruled that it is unconstitutional for state officials to compose an official school prayer and encourage its recitation in public schools, due to violation of the First Amendment. The ruling has been the subject of intense debate.

Background
On November 30, 1951, the Board of Regents of New York approved a nondenominational prayer for their morning procedures.  Students would be given the choice to be excused for the morning prayer if they chose to.  The prayer was twenty-two words that went as follows:

The case was brought by a group of families of public school students in New Hyde Park from the Herricks Union Free School District who sued the school board president William J. Vitale, Jr. The families argued that the voluntary prayer written by the state board of regents to "Almighty God" contradicted their religious beliefs. Led by Steven I. Engel, a Jewish man, the plaintiffs sought to challenge the constitutionality of the state's prayer in school policy.  They were supported by groups opposed to the school prayer including rabbinical organizations, Ethical Culture, and Jewish organizations. 

The acting parties were neither all members of a single particular religious persuasion, nor all atheists. Their religious identities were legally identified in court paperwork as two Jews, an atheist, a Unitarian church member, and a member of the New York Society for Ethical Culture. However, despite being listed in the court papers as an atheist, plaintiff Lawrence Roth, who was raised Jewish, later denied that he was an atheist and described himself as religious and a participant of prayer. When religious affiliation was discussed during preparations for the case, Roth claimed he was "a very religious person, but not a churchgoer" and that he said prayers but was unsure of what prayer could accomplish. This resulted in the group's lawyer telling him "You're the atheist." Roth later stated "apparently, you have to have an atheist in the crowd, so we started from there."

The plaintiffs argued that opening the school day with such a prayer violates the Establishment Clause of the First Amendment to the United States Constitution (as applied to the states through the Fourteenth Amendment), which states, in part, "Congress shall make no law respecting an establishment of religion". The governments of twenty-two states submitted an amicus curiae brief to the Supreme Court urging affirmance of the New York Court of Appeals decision that upheld the constitutionality of the prayer.  The American Jewish Committee, the Synagogue Council of America, and the American Ethical Union each submitted briefs urging the Court to instead reverse and rule that the prayer was unconstitutional.

Opinion of the Court
In a 6–1 decision, the Supreme Court held that reciting government-written prayers in public schools was unconstitutional, violating the Establishment Clause of the First Amendment.

In his opinion for the Court, Justice Black explained the importance of separation between church and state by giving a lengthy history of the issue, beginning with the 16th century in England. He noted that prayer is a religious activity by its very nature, and that prescribing such a religious activity for school children violates the Establishment Clause.

The Court rejected the defendant's arguments that students were not asked to observe any specific established religion, that the traditional heritage of the nation was religious, and that the prayer was voluntary. The Court held that the mere promotion of a religion is sufficient to establish a violation, even if that promotion is not coercive. The Court further held that the fact that the prayer is vaguely-enough worded not to promote any particular religion is not a sufficient defense, as it still promotes a family of religions (those that recognize "Almighty God"), which still violates the Establishment Clause.

In a concurring opinion, Justice Douglas argued that the Establishment Clause is also violated when the government grants financial aid to religious schools.

In his dissenting opinion, Justice Stewart contended that the Establishment Clause was originally written to abolish the idea of a state-sponsored church, and not to stop a non-mandatory "brief non-denominational prayer".

Subsequent developments
Since its decision, Engel has been the subject of intense debate. It has become considered one of the Court's "liberal" decisions alongside decisions such as its sequel, Abington School District v. Schempp,  Griswold v. Connecticut, Miranda v. Arizona and its sequel, in re Gault, Eisenstadt v. Baird,  Roe v. Wade, Obergefell v. Hodges, Miller v. California and Mapp v. Ohio, and has been criticized for its broadness in holding that a showing of coercion is not required to demonstrate an Establishment Clause violation.

Engel has been the basis for several subsequent decisions limiting government-directed prayer in school. In Wallace v. Jaffree (1985), the Supreme Court ruled Alabama's law permitting one minute for prayer or meditation was unconstitutional. In Lee v. Weisman (1992), the court prohibited clergy-led prayer at middle school graduation ceremonies. Lee v. Weisman, in turn, was a basis for Santa Fe ISD v. Doe (2000), in which the Court extended the ban to school-organized student-led prayer at high school football games in which a majority of students voted in favor of the prayer.

One myth of the Engel v. Vitale case was that an atheist leader Madalyn Murray O'Hair was responsible for the landmark ruling of the case. A year after the 1962 ruling there were two separate suits challenging Bible-reading; one by Ed Schempp in Philadelphia and the other by Mrs. O'Hair in Maryland. The court combined the two cases and subsequently ruled consistent with Engel.

See also
 List of United States Supreme Court cases, volume 370
 List of United States Supreme Court cases
 Separation of church and state in the United States
 West Virginia State Board of Education v. Barnette (1943)
 Everson v. Board of Education (1947)
 Abington School District v. Schempp (1963)
 Lemon v. Kurtzman (1971)
 Wallace v. Jaffree (1985)
 Kennedy v. Bremerton School District (2022)
 Herricks Union Free School District

References

Further reading
 
 .
 Laats, Adam. "Our schools, our country: American evangelicals, public schools, and the Supreme Court decisions of 1962 and 1963." Journal of religious history 36.3 (2012): 319-334.
 .
 .

External links
 
 
 Government case review

Establishment Clause case law
1962 in United States case law
Religion and education
United States education case law
Education in Nassau County, New York
1962 in religion
1962 in education
American Civil Liberties Union litigation
United States Supreme Court cases of the Warren Court
Religion in New York (state)
Prayer
United States Supreme Court cases